Gewandhaus is a concert hall in Leipzig, the home of the Leipzig Gewandhaus Orchestra. Today's hall is the third to bear this name; like the second, it is noted for its fine acoustics.

History

The first Gewandhaus (Altes Gewandhaus)
The first concert hall was constructed in 1781 by architect Johann Carl Friedrich Dauthe inside the Gewandhaus, a building used by cloth (garment) merchants. Beethoven's Piano Concerto No. 5 (The Emperor Concerto) premiered here in 1811. Felix Mendelssohn is particularly associated with the first Gewandhaus, of which he was director from 1835.

Other well-known works which premiered at the Altes Gewandhaus include:

 Schubert's Great Symphony (21 March 1839, posth.)
 Schumann's Spring Symphony (31 March 1841)
 Mendelssohn's Scottish Symphony (3 March 1842)
 Mendelssohn's Violin Concerto (13 March 1845)
 Wagner's overture to The Mastersingers of Nuremberg (2 June 1862; the full opera was not performed until 1868)
 Brahms' A German Requiem (first full performance, 18 February 1869)
 Brahms Violin Concerto (1 January 1879)

The Altes Gewandhaus was used for concerts until 1884, sporadically between then until 1886. Despite several expansions, it eventually became too small to accommodate the burgeoning number of concertgoers from Germany's newly emergent middle class. Thus between 1893 and 1896 it was repurposed, partially demolished, and refitted to form an annexe of the Städtisches Kaufhaus.

The second Gewandhaus
The second Gewandhaus was designed by Martin Gropius. It opened on 11 December 1884, and had a main concert hall and a chamber music hall. During this era the Gewandhaus was directed by some of the most renowned conductors of the day, such as Arthur Nikisch, Wilhelm Furtwängler and Bruno Walter.

It was severely damaged in the firebombing of Leipzig in World War II during two separate raids on 4 December 1943 and 20 February 1944. Despite initial plans for rebuilding, the East German government deemed the ruins too structurally unsound, and they were demolished on 29 March 1968. The site was used as a carpark for several decades, until the Humanities faculty of Leipzig University was opened on the grounds in 2002.

The third Gewandhaus

The third and current Gewandhaus on Augustusplatz and the eastern part of the inner city ring road opened on 8 October 1981, two hundred years after the Leipzig Gewandhaus Orchestra moved into the original hall. The foundation stone was laid by conductor Kurt Masur on 8 November 1977. The architect was Rudolf Skoda, who like his predecessor Dauthe was also a native of Leipzig. The design of the hall carefully took into consideration its precedents' reputation for excellent acoustics. During construction, the hall was even filled up several times with soldiers of the East German Nationale Volksarmee to test its sound quality at full capacity.

During the Autumn of Nations in 1989, the Gewandhaus became a platform for political dissent against the Communist authorities, as Masur opened up the hall for public discussion on the future and reform of the GDR (the so-called "Gewandhaus Talks").

Today's Gewandhaus has a seating capacity of 1900, and features a Schuke concert organ with 6,845 pipes.

Gallery

See also
List of concert halls

References

Sources
 Leo Beranek, Concert Halls and Opera Houses: Musics, Acoustics, and Architecture, Springer, 2004, page 280. .

External links

 History of the Gewandhaus from the official site

Concert halls in Germany
Buildings and structures in Leipzig
Buildings and structures completed in 1981
Tourist attractions in Leipzig
1981 establishments in East Germany
Music venues completed in 1781
Music venues completed in 1884
Music venues completed in 1981